Kim Yeon-beom (born 10 December 1934) is a South Korean long-distance runner. He competed in the marathon at the 1960 Summer Olympics and the 1964 Summer Olympics.

References

External links
 

1934 births
Living people
Athletes (track and field) at the 1960 Summer Olympics
Athletes (track and field) at the 1964 Summer Olympics
South Korean male long-distance runners
South Korean male marathon runners
Olympic athletes of South Korea
Sportspeople from South Jeolla Province
20th-century South Korean people